Discoveries may refer to:

Music 
 Discoveries (Cannonball Adderley album), 1955
 Discoveries (Josh Nelson album), 2011
 Discoveries (Northlane album), 2011

Other uses 
 Discoveries (film), a 1939 British film
 Discoveries (horse), a racehorse
 Discoveries (Robertson Davies), a 2002 book by Robertson Davies
 Discoveries (TV series), a Canadian youth science television series which aired on CBC Television in 1957
 Abrams Discoveries, a series of illustrated non-fiction books published by Harry N. Abrams
 Discoveries, a work by William Butler Yeats, written in 1907
 Discoveries, a magazine published by Cedars-Sinai Medical Center

See also
 Age of Discoveries
 Discovery (disambiguation)
 Explorations (disambiguation)